Utku Yuvakuran (born 2 November 1997) is a Turkish footballer who plays as a goalkeeper for Beşiktaş.

Professional career
Yuvakuran made his professional debut with Beşiktaş in a 1–1 Turkish Cup tie with Kayserispor on 26 January 2017.

He made his Süper Lig debut with Beşiktaş in 26 August 2018 against Antalyaspor in Vodafone Park. Yuvakuran replaced Tolga Zengin in their match against Antalyaspor, because Tolga Zengin's injury. Unfortunately Beşiktaş lost the match as 2-3, on his debut. Yuvakuran made his European debut in the play-off round of 2018-19 UEFA Europa League against Partizan in 30 August 2018. Beşiktaş defeated Partizan in a score of 3–0. During the season when Loris Karius signs with Beşiktaş Yuvakuran became the second goalkeeper.

In the 2020–21 season of the Süper Lig Yuvakuran started as the second goalkeeper in Beşiktaş behind Ersin Destanoğlu. In 24 September 2020, Yuvakuran was the goalkeeper of Beşiktaş in the third qualifying round of 2020-21 UEFA Europa League. They played against Rio Ave in Vodafone Park. The  match ended 1–1, but in the penalty shoot-out they lost it as 2–4, eventually Beşiktaş was eliminated. In the tenth week of Süper Lig, in 29 November 2020, Beşiktaş faced Fenerbahçe in Kadıköy. In the absence of Ersin Destanoğlu, Yuvakuran replaced him in the derby. Beşiktaş defeated Fenerbahçe with a score of 3–4. Yuvakuran was the goalkeeper in this historic event, as this was the first away victory for Beşiktaş against Fenerbahçe after 15 years. At the end of the season, Beşiktaş won the title in Süper Lig.

On 31 August 2021, Yuvakuran was loaned to Fatih Karagümrük.

Personal life
Utku is the son of Semih Yuvakuran, a former Turkish international footballer. He is one of three triplets, all of whom are footballers.

Career statistics
As of 20 May 2020.

Honours

Club
Beşiktaş J.K.
Süper Lig: 2016–17, 2020–21
Türkiye Kupası: 2020–21

References

External links
 

1997 births
Living people
Turkish footballers
Turkey under-21 international footballers
Turkey youth international footballers
Association football goalkeepers
TFF Third League players
Süper Lig players
Beylerbeyi S.K. footballers
Beşiktaş J.K. footballers
Fatih Karagümrük S.K. footballers